Momentum is the fourth EP by Battery, released on November 17, 1998 by COP International. The album peaked at #15 on the CMJ RPM charts.

Reception
A critic at Last Sigh Magazine called Momentum "not music to necessarily relax to, Hate Dept., Cameron Lewis (Ipecac Loop), Fishtank No. 9 and Heavy Water Factory kick it hard with their own renditions of Battery songs that whisp the listener into another dimension of high intensity sound energy." Sonic Boom said "If you are looking for a band with unbelievable strong female vocals and who are not afraid to develop a music style all of their own that have a listen to Battery and I am sure that you will not be disappointed."

Track listing

Personnel
Adapted from the Momentum liner notes.

Battery
 Maria Azevedo – lead vocals, production, recording
 Shawn Brice – instruments, production, recording
 Evan Sornstein (Curium Design) – instruments, production, recording, cover art, illustrations, design

Additional performers
 Warren Harrison – remixer (5)
 Cameron Lewis – remixer (7)
 Jesse McClear – remixer (4)
 Steven Seibold – remixer (2)

Production and design
 Christian Petke (as Count Zero) – production

Release history

References

External links 
 Momentum at Discogs (list of releases)

1998 EPs
Battery (electro-industrial band) albums
COP International EPs